The Hungarian Cycling Federation or MKSZ (in Hungarian: Magyar Kerékpáros Szövetség) is the national governing body of cycle racing in Hungary. It was established on 3 May 1894 by 6 clubs: Budai Kerékpár Egyesület, Budapesti Kerékpár Egyesület, Budapesti Torna Klub, Hunnia Bicycle Club, Magyar Testgyakorlók Köre, Nemzeti Kerékpár Egyesület.

The MKSZ is a member of the UCI and the UEC.

Events
The federation organizes following cycling events every year, which are part of UCI Europe Tour:
 Tour de Hongrie (2.1)

as well as 
 Hungarian National Road Race Championships
 Hungarian National Time Trial Championships

Other events are:
 Tour de Ajka
 Tour de Velencei-tó
 Balmaz Nagydíj

External links
 Hungarian Cycling Federation official website

National members of the European Cycling Union
Cycling
Cycle racing organizations
Cycle racing in Hungary